Cesare Cattaneo (born 18 August 1951 in Verano Brianza) is an Italian professional football coach and a former player.

He played 9 seasons (187 games, 6 goals) in the Serie A for A.C. Milan, Avellino and Udinese Calcio.

His professional debut on 29 March 1970 for A.C. Milan was not a happy one, coach Nereo Rocco was forced to field Cattaneo in the game against Juventus F.C. after injuries to Karl-Heinz Schnellinger and Saul Malatrasi. Cattaneo was marking Pietro Anastasi, who had no problem with the 18-year-old defender and scored 2 goals in the 3-0 Juve win.

External links
 magliarossonera.it 

1951 births
Living people
Italian footballers
Serie A players
A.C. Milan players
Taranto F.C. 1927 players
Como 1907 players
Hellas Verona F.C. players
Ternana Calcio players
U.S. Avellino 1912 players
Udinese Calcio players
S.S.D. Varese Calcio players
L.R. Vicenza players
Italian football managers
A.C. Voghera managers
Association football defenders